The Eleventh Street School is a historic building in Gadsden, Alabama.  Built in 1907, it is the oldest surviving public school in Gadsden.  An addition of 8 classrooms, a lunchroom, and two other rooms was added in 1926.  The building operated as a school until 1962, and later served as an adult education center and storage and offices for the city board of education.  The building is two stories with a partially above-ground basement.  The façade has stone steps leading to a shallow portico, with two Ionic columns supporting a denticulated cornice.  Above the portico sits a Palladian window.  The building was listed on the National Register of Historic Places in 1984.

References

National Register of Historic Places in Etowah County, Alabama
School buildings on the National Register of Historic Places in Alabama
School buildings completed in 1907
Schools in Etowah County, Alabama
Buildings and structures in Gadsden, Alabama
1907 establishments in Alabama